The 1985 Snooker World Cup sponsored by Guinness was a team snooker tournament with a revamped format. Gone was the round-robin system which had been in place since the first one in 1979 and the tournament was now a knock-out format with eight teams. It moved from October to March as the new Grand Prix tournament now took its old slot in the snooker calendar which was also played at the previous venue, the Hexagon Theatre in Reading. Guinness became the first of many sponsors for the next few years after British American Tobacco, under its trade name State Express, pulled out of all sport sponsorship in Great Britain. This new competition was now played at the new Bournemouth International Centre.

England now played in two teams, with the defending champions competing as "England A" with the same players (Steve Davis, Tony Knowles and Tony Meo) while Jimmy White, Willie Thorne and John Spencer competed as "England B". The two Irish jurisdictions competed as "All-Ireland" and, for the first time since 1980, a "Rest of the World" team played with Silvino Francisco, Dene O'Kane and American pool player Jim Rempe (who also competed in 1980). Eventually, All-Ireland won the title, beating "England A" in a 17-frame final.
 


Main draw

Teams

Final

References

World Cup (snooker)
World Cup
World Cup